Anna's Hope Village is an administrative sub-district of St. Croix, U.S. Virgin Islands.

History

Anna's Hope was during the Danish colonial era a sugar plantation.

References 

Sub-districts of Saint Croix, U.S. Virgin Islands
Plantations in the Danish West Indies